Kiritapu Lyndsay Allan (born 1984) is a New Zealand politician and Member of Parliament (MP) in the New Zealand House of Representatives. A member of the Labour Party, she entered the House as a list MP in 2017, and won the East Coast electorate in 2020.

Early life
Allan was born in Te Karaka, of Ngāti Ranginui and Ngāti Tūwharetoa descent. She is the ninth of ten children. Taika Waititi is her cousin. She grew up in Paengaroa.

She dropped out of high school at 16. She worked at a KFC franchise in West Auckland (she joined the Service & Food Workers Union at that time) and as a cherry picker.

She studied law and politics at Victoria University of Wellington. During her university studies she worked as an intern with Prime Minister Helen Clark.

Career before politics 
She worked for a period at law firm ChenPalmer. Later she was a commercial lawyer and business consultant in Whakatāne before becoming a politician.

Political career

Allan did not win the electorate (she came second to Anne Tolley), but entered Parliament via the party list.

In 2018, Allan launched the political podcast Authorised By with Green Party MP Chlöe Swarbrick.

During the 52nd New Zealand Parliament she was Labour's junior whip, and therefore the junior government whip. She was also a member of various Select Committees, including the Epidemic Response Committee during the COVID-19 pandemic. By the end of 2018, Allan was labelled a strong performer among backbenchers in Parliament. She is also the chair of Labour's rural caucus.

Ahead of the 2020 New Zealand general election, Allan was ranked at 25 on Labour's party list and was selected by the party to contest the East Coast electorate again. Anne Tolley, who had defeated Allan for the seat in 2017 had decided to contest the 2020 election as a List only candidate, and then had later decided to retire outright, leaving the seat open.

The 2020 election was held on 17 October 2020, Allan was elected as MP for East Coast, which saw a landslide victory for the Labour party. She defeated National's candidate Tania Tapsell by a final margin of 6,331 votes.

On 2 November 2020, Prime Minister Jacinda Ardern announced she would enter Cabinet during her second term in parliament, becoming Minister for Conservation and Minister for Emergency Management. In addition, she also assumed the associate ministerial portfolios for Arts, Culture and Heritage and Environment.

On 6 April 2021, Allan announced she would be taking medical leave after being diagnosed with stage 3 cervical cancer.

In a June 2022 reshuffle, Allan was promoted from Conservation to instead be Minister of Justice. Following Jacinda Ardern's resignation as Prime Minister in 2023, Allan was speculated to be a Labour leadership candidate, but declined to run.

Personal life
She married Natalie Coates in 2016 after same-sex marriage was legalised in New Zealand. They had a baby just before the 2017 election and Allan brought the baby to Parliament. She and Coates divorced in May 2022. Allan's current partner is RNZ National presenter Māni Dunlop, to whom she is engaged.

References

External links
 
 Profile, NZ Labour Party
 Profile, NZ Parliament

|-

|-

|-

|-

1984 births
Living people
New Zealand Labour Party MPs
Members of the New Zealand House of Representatives
New Zealand list MPs
Lesbian politicians
LGBT members of the Parliament of New Zealand
Women members of the New Zealand House of Representatives
Candidates in the 2017 New Zealand general election
People from the Gisborne District
Ngāti Ranginui people
Ngāti Tūwharetoa people
Māori MPs
Candidates in the 2020 New Zealand general election
Justice ministers of New Zealand
Female justice ministers
Members of the Cabinet of New Zealand
Women government ministers of New Zealand